Jean Racine (1639–1699) was a French dramatist.

Jean Racine may also refer to:

 Jean-François Racine (born 1982), ice hockey goaltender
 Jean-Paul Racine (1928–1988), Canadian politician
 Jean Prahm (born 1978), formerly Jean Racine, bobsledder